Maximiliano Joel Falcón Picart (born 1 May 1997) is a Uruguayan professional footballer who plays as a defender for Chilean Primera División club Colo-Colo.

Club career
A former youth academy player of Nacional, Falcón joined Rentistas in 2019. He made his professional debut for the club on 11 May 2019, coming on as an early substitute in a 1–0 home victory over Cerrito.

International career
Falcón is a former Uruguay youth international and have played for under-20 team in few friendlies. On 5 March 2021, he was named in Uruguay senior team's 35-man preliminary squad for 2022 FIFA World Cup qualifying matches against Argentina and Bolivia. However, CONMEBOL suspended those matches next day amid concern over the COVID-19 pandemic.

Career statistics

Club

Honours

Club
Rentistas
 Torneo Apertura (1): 2020

Colo-Colo
 Copa Chile (1): 2021
 Supercopa de Chile (1): 2022

References

External links
Maximiliano Falcón at Fox Sports

1997 births
Living people
Uruguayan footballers
Uruguayan expatriate footballers
Uruguay youth international footballers
Club Nacional de Football players
C.A. Rentistas players
Colo-Colo footballers
Uruguayan Primera División players
Uruguayan Segunda División players
Chilean Primera División players
Expatriate footballers in Chile
Uruguayan expatriate sportspeople in Chile
Association football defenders
Footballers from Paysandú